is a former Japanese footballer who last played as a striker for Tegevajaro Miyazaki.

Career
After spending close to six years with Honda Lock S.C. in the Japan Football League Mizunaga signed for fellow Japan Football League side V-Varen Nagasaki for the 2011 season.

Mizunaga began the 2013 in the J. League Division 2 with V-Varen Nagasaki after the club gained promotion to the league. Mizunaga made his full-professional debut in the 2nd Division on 3 March 2013 against Fagiano Okayama in which he came on as a 75th-minute substitute for Kōichi Satō as V–Varen drew the match 1–1. Mizunaga then scored his first ever goal in the J. League Division 2 the very next game against former Japanese champions Gamba Osaka in which was also V–Varen's first home game in the 2nd Division in front of over 18,000 fans in attendance in which he scored in the 79th minute for the club which turned out to be a consolation as V–Varen Nagasaki lost the match 3–1. He then scored his second goal of the season on 24 March 2013 against Matsumoto Yamaga before scoring his third goal the very next game on 31 March 2013 against Gainare Tottori in which V–Varen Nagasaki won 3–1.

After a long journey through different clubs in J. League, Mizunaga came back home and joined newly-promoted JFL-team Tegevajaro Miyazaki in December 2017. In 2022, having lastly played for them, he announced his retirement.

Club statistics
Updated to 8 March 2020.

References

External links 
Profile at Tegevajaro Miyazaki
Profile at Giravanz Kitakyushu

 

1985 births
Living people
Association football people from Miyazaki Prefecture
Japanese footballers
J2 League players
J3 League players
Japan Football League players
Honda Lock SC players
V-Varen Nagasaki players
Zweigen Kanazawa players
Giravanz Kitakyushu players
Tegevajaro Miyazaki players
Association football forwards